Touro College Berlin is a small independent American college in Berlin, Germany.

Touro College Berlin was founded in 2003 as the first and only Jewish American college in Germany. The college is part of the Touro College and University System network with branches in New York, Paris, Moscow, and Jerusalem, among others. While all the Touro Colleges are having an American background, students and faculty at Touro College Berlin come from all over the world and the language of instruction is English.

Touro College Berlin is offering four-year undergraduate degrees in Business and Psychology and a Master of Business Administration. Students can obtain a German and a US degree at the same time if they are eligible. Graduate students can also study for the MA Holocaust Communication and Tolerance.  Touro College Berlin has been fully accredited by the :de:Wissenschaftsrat in 2012, and by the Middle States Commission on Higher Education and New York State Department of Education.

Touro College Berlin is the only college in Germany where it is possible to study a full MA program on the history of the Holocaust.

The college is located in the historic Paul Lindemann villa, designed by modernist architect Bruno Paul, in the leafy suburb of Charlottenburg overlooking the Havel river.

References

Universities and colleges in Berlin
Touro University System